Jason Matthew Rebello (born 29 March 1969) is a British pianist, songwriter, and record producer.

Career
Rebello was born in Carshalton, Surrey.  His father's family is from India. Rebello was raised a Catholic in Wandsworth, London. He was classically trained beginning at the age of 19 at Guildhall School of Music and Drama.

He emerged in the late 1980s as a jazz pianist influenced by Herbie Hancock and McCoy Tyner. In his early 20s he recorded three solo albums, beginning with his debut album A Clearer View (1990), which was produced by Wayne Shorter and led to him appearing on the cover of The Wire magazine. He also worked with Jean Toussaint, Tommy Smith, and Branford Marsalis, and presented Artrageous! on BBC television.

In 1998 Sting invited Rebello to join his band following the death of Kenny Kirkland. He toured with Sting for the next six years and recorded three albums. He then became a member of Jeff Beck's band, touring for six years and recording three albums. During these years with Sting (musician) and Beck, Rebello also worked with Chaka Khan, Des'ree, Mica Paris, Carleen Anderson, Manu Katché, Phil Collins, and Peter Gabriel.

In May 2013 Rebello told The Huffington Post that after twelve years of touring as a session musician he was now reestablishing himself as a solo artist, specifically in jazz. On 4 November 2013 he released the album Anything But Look on Lyte Records. It features Will Downing, Omar, Joy Rose, Jacob Collier, Tim Garland and Pino Palladino.

Rebello teaches music at his alma mater, Guildhall School of Music and Bath Spa University. Additionally, he composes music for the London-based production music library, Audio Network.

Personal life
In his mid-20s he took a break from music to pursue interests in Buddhism. He later stated, "I think this was because I was enjoying a level of success that made me feel increasingly alienated."
He has two sons, George and Jacques.

Awards and honors
 Album of the Year, Held, British Jazz Awards, 2016
 British Jazz Awards (piano), 2016

Discography
 A Clearer View (1990)
 Keeping Time (1993)
 Make It Real (1994)
 Last Dance (1995)
 Next Time Round (1999)
 Jazz Rainbow (2007)
 Anything But Look (2013)
 Held (2016)

With Sting
 Brand New Day  (1999)
 ...All This Time (2001)
 Sacred Love (2003)

With Tommy Smith
 Peeping Tom (1990)

Notes and references

Further reading

External links
 Official website

1969 births
Living people
People from Wandsworth
Alumni of the Guildhall School of Music and Drama
English jazz pianists
English jazz composers
Male jazz composers
English male composers
Jazz fusion pianists
Jazz fusion keyboardists
Post-bop pianists
British male pianists
21st-century pianists
21st-century British male musicians
Edition Records artists
Sony BMG artists
Whirlwind Recordings artists